The action of 25 February 1781 was a naval engagement fought off Cape Finisterre between the Spanish naval frigate sixth rate Graña of 30 guns and the Royal Navy fifth-rate frigate HMS Cerberus of 32 guns. Graña surrendered after a hard fight.

On 25 February 1781, whilst cruising 20 leagues off Cape Finisterre, HMS Cerberus, under Captain Robert Mann, sighted Graña.

Graña, under Don Nicolás de Medina, was a month out of Ferrol but had captured little. Cerberus closed on Graña and within fifteen minutes the British had won. The Spanish officers fought as long as they could, but as Cerberuss broadsides took effect the Spanish sailors refused to fight. Further resistance seemed pointless, so De Medina struck Grañas colours.

In the action with Cerberus, Graña lost her first lieutenant and six men killed, and seventeen men wounded, out of her crew of 166 men; the British suffered only two men wounded. The Royal Navy took Graña into service as HMS Grana. Following his victory, Captain Mann received command of the 64-gun .

Citations and references
Citations

References

Conflicts in 1781
Naval battles of the American Revolutionary War involving Spain
Naval battles of the American Revolutionary War
Naval battles of the Anglo-Spanish War (1779–1783)